Asociația Club Sportiv Gauss Bacău, commonly known as Gauss Bacău, or simply as Gauss, is a Romanian  football club based in Bacău, Bacău County. Founded in 2006 under the name of Mesagerul Bacău, the club promoted to Liga III in 2010, then being bought by Municipality of Bacău and changed its name in SC Bacău. Under this name, the club obtained its best rankings, promoting in the second tier and obtaining at its best a 4th place. In 2016 the Municipality retired its financial support and Sport Club withdrew from the second league, then being bought by Cristian Postolache and merging with his club, Gauss Răcăciuni, changing its name in Gauss Bacău and therefore signing up for the Liga III.

History

First years and ascension
Gauss Bacău was founded in 2006 under the name of Mesagerul Bacău, project started at the initiative of a group of football lovers, a group of friends who used to play five-a-side football and decided to play at a more organized level.

Sports activities started during the 2006–07 competitive season when Mesagerul Bacău was enrolled in the Liga V and the team had surprisingly good results managing to qualify for the Liga IV – Bacău County promotion play-offs after finishing 3rd. Due to lack of experience, the team failed to promote. Next season, Mesagerul was ranked 1st after a great journey thus fulfilling its goal, to promote in the Liga IV. Following the Liga IV promotion, the club managed to obtain a 1st place again, in its very first year of participation, having also a great standing line. Eventually, the promotion to Liga III was missed at penalty shoot-out in front of FC Dumitrești, Vrancea County champions, score 3–5.

In the 2009–10 edition Mesagerul  won again the Liga IV and this time promoted to Liga III after winning a promotion play-off match against Mureș County champions, Gaz Metan Târgu Mureș, score 8–7 at penalty shoot-out.

In July 2010, after the promotion, the team was bought by the Municipality of Bacău and changed its name from Mesagerul Bacău to Sport Club Bacău. In its first two seasons of Liga III, SC Bacău was every time ranked as 2nd, then in the 2012–13 Liga III season, which was a great one for the club, SC Bacău managed to take the 1st place and promoted to Liga II. In their first two Liga II seasons, the team played very well and succeeded to obtain a play-off qualification every time, finishing on 6th place, respectively 4th place at the end of the play-off phase.

Downfall
After finishing the 2015–16 Liga II season on 6th place, financial problems made the club join Liga III for the 2016–17 season. Abandoned by Bacău Municipality and with a lot of debts the club was bought by Cristian Postolache, the former owner of Bacău County champions, Gauss Răcăciuni, a team which failed to achieve the promotion to Liga III. Despite the fact that the team had good performances on the pitch the financial situation of the club was difficult to balance due to historical debts and memoirs made by former players. SC Bacău was penalized with 60 points by Romanian Football Federation, finishing last one with −25 points and relegated to Liga IV at 7 years after its promotion to the professional football.

After the relegation, the penalties continued to run for SC Bacău, so the club's management decided to reorganize the club's structure, now situated at amateur level, in Liga IV – Bacău County. SC Bacău was renamed as Gauss Bacău and kept its administrative and technical staff, and most of the players. At the end of the season Gauss won Liga IV – Bacău County and the promotion play-off, but before the first round of the new Liga III season withdrew due to financial problems.

After a season if inactivity, Gauss ownership decided to "wake up" the team and enrolled it in the Liga IV.

Honours
Liga III
Winners (1): 2012–13
Runners-up (1): 2010–11, 2011–12
Liga IV – Bacău County
Winners (3): 2008–09, 2009–10, 2017–18
Liga V – Bacău County
Winners (1): 2007–08

References

External links
ACS Gauss Bacău at frf-ajf.ro

Association football clubs established in 2006
Football clubs in Bacău County
Liga II clubs
Liga III clubs
Liga IV clubs
2006 establishments in Romania